Apion frumentarium is a species of beetle in family Brentidae. It is found in the Palearctic.

References

Brentidae
Beetles described in 1758
Taxa named by Carl Linnaeus